Eli Vakil (born March 4, 1953) is an Israeli clinical neuropsychologist. Vakil is a professor emeritus and former departmental chairman of the Department of Psychology, and the head of the Memory and Amnesia Lab  at the Gonda (Goldschmied) Multidisciplinary Brain Research Center at Bar Ilan University. He is also director of the Rehabilitation Center for Veterans after Traumatic Brain-Injury (TBI) in Jaffa, Israel.

Biography
In 1974–1976, Vakil studied at Bar-Ilan University, Ramat-Gan, graduating with a B.A. in psychology. He received his Ph.D. in clinical neuropsychology from the City University of New York (CUNY) in 1985. 
His dissertation was titled: "Encoding of frequency of occurrence, temporal order, and spatial location information by closed-head-injured and elderly subjects: Is it automatic?"
Vakil is married with three children and lives in Ra'anana.

Academic and therapy career
Vakil started his career as a clinical neuropsychologist working in rehabilitation with patients who had sustained severe head-injuries. He worked at the Head Trauma Program at the Rusk Institute of Rehabilitation Medicine in New York University Medical Center, and in the Recanati National Institute for the Rehabilitation of the head-injured person in Israel.

In the summer of 2017, he was a visiting scholar at the Kessler Foundation in West Orange, New Jersey.

Vakil was chairman of the rehabilitation psychology section in the Israeli Psychological Association and as the head of the rehabilitation psychology subprogram at Bar-Ilan University.

He is a founding member of the Israeli Neuropsychological Society and has served as a board member of the International Neuropsychological Society (INS).

Vakil has served as an associate editor of the Journal of the International Neuropsychological Society (JINS).

In 2017 he received the Distinguished Career Award of the International Neuropsychological Society (INS).

Awards and recognition
 Chairman of the Psychology Department, Bar-Ilan University (2003-2005)
 Governing Board member of the International Neuropsychological Society (INS) (2004 - 2007) 
 Head of the Rehabilitation Psychology Subprogram, Psychology Department, Bar-Ilan University (1996-1999)

References

External links 
 
 

Bar-Ilan University alumni
Israeli neurologists
Academic staff of Bar-Ilan University
Israeli neuroscientists
People from Ra'anana
1953 births
City University of New York alumni
Neuropsychologists
Israeli psychologists
Living people